Uhlerstown is an unincorporated community in Tinicum Township, Bucks County, Pennsylvania, United States. The community is located along Pennsylvania Route 32 (River Road) and is served by the 18920 ZIP Code.

Uhlerstown is one of the many Delaware River communities in the county. In 1949, painter Frederick Harer died here.

Uhlerstown actually uses the post office and ZIP Code of nearby Erwinna; therefore, many Uhlerstown residents say that they are from Erwinna, as that is what shows up on their addresses.

The Uhlerstown-Frenchtown Bridge, a free Delaware River Joint Toll Bridge Commission bridge over the Delaware River, connects Pennsylvania Route 32 in Uhlerstown to New Jersey Route 12 in Frenchtown in Hunterdon County, New Jersey; PA 32 leads south to Interstate 295, which leads to Philadelphia. The existing bridge has a roadway width of 16 feet 6 inches. A sidewalk is supported on steel cantilever brackets. The bridge maintains a fifteen-mile per hour speed limit.

The Uhlerstown Historic District was added to the National Register of Historic Places in 1994.

References

External links

Unincorporated communities in Bucks County, Pennsylvania
Unincorporated communities in Pennsylvania